Coccothrinax trinitensis is a palm which is endemic to east central Cuba.

Henderson and colleagues (1995) considered C. trinitensis to be a synonym of Coccothrinax miraguama.

References

trinitensis
Trees of Cuba
Plants described in 1985